is a pet insurance company  based in Tokyo, Japan with its headquarters in Shinjuku.

History
The company was founded in 2000 by Nobuaki Komori, formerly of Tokio Marine.  As of December 2007, Anicom's total number of subscribers exceeded  294,000.  The company works with over 4,000 animal hospitals and clinics and has paid out more than one million benefit payments.

Listing on stock exchange
Anicom had been managed as a mutual aid enterprise by members of Anicom Club. Anicom made their request to the Financial Services Agency of Japan and at the same time increased the capital stock amount. On December 26, 2007, the subsidiary company, Anicom Property and Casualty Insurance Corporation, acquired their property and casualty insurance license from the Financial Services Agency of Japan becoming the first pet insurance specialist company in Japan.

Anicom Holdings, Inc. was listed on the Tokyo Stock Exchange (Mothers listing) on March 3, 2010.

Related business
Anicom holds animal welfare and protection awareness programs. Anicom sponsors pet related publications and magazines and helps manage website information with animal hospitals throughout Japan.

References

External links
Anicom Insurance
Anicom Pafe

Financial services companies established in 2000
Insurance companies of Japan
Companies listed on the Tokyo Stock Exchange
Pet insurance